Thomas Gamble (born 21 June 1800) was an English cricketer who was recorded in one first-class match in 1826 when he played for a combined Sheffield and Leicester team, scoring 61 runs in his only innings and holding one catch. Gamble played for Leicester Cricket Club from 1825 to 1829.

References

1800 births
English cricketers
English cricketers of 1826 to 1863
Leicestershire cricketers
Year of death unknown